Slavcho Boychev (born 2 May 1983) is a Bulgarian footballer, currently playing for FC Kyustendil as a defender.

Boychev previously played for Marek Dupnitsa and Montana in the A PFG.

References

1983 births
Living people
Bulgarian footballers
First Professional Football League (Bulgaria) players
PFC Minyor Pernik players
PFC Marek Dupnitsa players
FC Montana players
OFC Vihren Sandanski players

Association football defenders